Bhimalapuram is a village in West Godavari district in the state of Andhra Pradesh in India. Bhimavaram  railway Junction connects major towns.

Demographics
 India census, Bhimalapuram has a population of 5302 of which 2646 are males while 2656 are females. The average sex ratio of Bhimalapuram village is 1004. The child population is 580, which makes up 10.94% of the total population of the village, with sex ratio 1071. In 2011, the literacy rate of Bhimalapuram village was 75.82% when compared to 67.02% of Andhra Pradesh.

See also 
 West Godavari district

References 

Villages in West Godavari district